Mikhail Vasilyevich Rudakov (1905–1979) was a Soviet military leader, Member of the Military Council of several Fronts during World War II, reaching service rank of lieutenant general.

Career
Since 1923, joined the Soviet Red Army.

Since 1926, became a member of the Soviet Communist Party. 
  
1938, graduated from the Lenin Military-Political Academy. 
  
1939, Political Commissar of 11th Army. 
  
1941 September, Member of the Military Council of the 27th Army (renamed as 4th Shock Army in December 1941).

November 1942, Member of the Military Council of Southwestern Front (Soviet Union) (renamed as 3rd Ukrainian Front in October 1943)

April 1944, Member of the Military Council of the 3rd Baltic Front.

November 1944, Member of the Military Council of the 1st Baltic Front.

February 1945, Samland Group of Forces.
   
After World War II, political works in the Soviet Armed Forces.

1952, graduated from the General Staff Academy.

Awards
2 Order of Lenin
4 Order of the Red Banner
1st class Order of Kutuzov
1st class Order of the Patriotic War
Order of the Red Banner of Labour

Sources
https://web.archive.org/web/20110722113057/http://victory.mil.ru/people/01/01/rudakov.html (in Russian)

1905 births
1979 deaths
Soviet military personnel of World War II
Lenin Military Political Academy alumni
Soviet lieutenant generals